Lucas Rangel Nunes Gonçalves (born 29 December 1994), commonly known as Lucas Rangel, is a Brazilian footballer who plays as a forward for Riga.

Career

On 21 March 2022, Sabah announced the signing of Rangel on loan until the end of the season from Vorskla Poltava.

On 18 July 2022, Riga announced the signing of Rangel.

Personal life
In March 2022, during the Russian invasion of Ukraine, Rangel made international news for his participation in the evacuation of the mother-in-law of social media influencer Anderson Dias.

Honours
KuPS
Veikkausliiga: 2019

References

External links
 

1994 births
Sportspeople from Rio Grande do Sul
Living people
Brazilian footballers
Association football midfielders
Brazilian expatriate footballers
Brazilian expatriate sportspeople in Albania
Expatriate footballers in Albania
Association football forwards
FK Kukësi players
Kategoria Superiore players
Expatriate footballers in Austria
Kapfenberger SV players
2. Liga (Austria) players
Veikkausliiga players
Kuopion Palloseura players
FC Vorskla Poltava players
Sabah FC (Azerbaijan) players
Brazilian expatriate sportspeople in Ukraine
Expatriate footballers in Ukraine
Brazilian expatriate sportspeople in Azerbaijan
Expatriate footballers in Azerbaijan
Ukrainian Premier League players